Scipione de Tolfa (died 1595) was a Roman Catholic prelate who served as Archbishop of Acerenza e Matera (1593–1595)
and Archbishop of Trani (1576–1593).

Biography
On 10 December 1576, Scipione de Tolfa was appointed during the papacy of Pope Gregory XIII as Archbishop of Trani.
On 20 December 1593, he was appointed during the papacy of Pope Clement VIII as Archbishop of Acerenza e Matera. 
He served as Archbishop of Acerenza e Matera until his death in 1595.

While bishop, he was the principal co-consecrator of José Esteve Juan, Bishop of Vieste (1586) and Benedetto Mandina, Bishop of Caserta.

References

External links and additional sources
 (for Chronology of Bishops) 
 (for Chronology of Bishops)  
 (for Chronology of Bishops) 
 (for Chronology of Bishops 

16th-century Italian Roman Catholic archbishops
Bishops appointed by Pope Gregory XIII
Bishops appointed by Pope Clement VIII
1595 deaths
Archbishops of Trani